Charles B. Benenson (30 January 1913 – 22 February 2004) was an American real estate developer and investor.

Biography
Benenson Realty Co. was founded by his father Benjamin Benenson in 1905 and grew into an industry leader under his guidance, until his death in 1938. The younger Benenson graduated from Yale University in 1933 and joined his father's firm in 1937, during the depths of the Great Depression through which the company survived due to their lucrative lease with The Horn & Hardart automat at 31st and Broadway. He ran the company until his death in 2004.

Benenson was a philanthropist and political donor. His efforts and views landed him on the master list of Nixon political opponents. He founded the Coalition Against Double Taxation in the 1980s in response to a proposal in Congress which would eradicate state and local income taxes as deductions. The coalition successfully quashed the measure, later becoming the National Realty Committee (NRC), then The Real Estate Roundtable. He was a founding member of the Association for a Better New York, the Realty Foundation, the Lincoln Center Real Estate and Construction Council, the New York Junior Tennis League, the I Have a Dream Program, and the Museum of African Art.

He was also a significant collector of African art, bequeathing much of his collection to the Yale University Art Gallery.

Personal life
In 1942, he married his first wife, Dorothy (née Freedman) with whom he had two children: Bruce William Benenson and Frederick C. Benenson. They later divorced (she remarried to Lewis B. Cullman). His second marriage was to Peggy A. (née Lipson) Coudert; they had one son, Lawrence B. Benenson. His third wife was Jane (née Garcy) Stein. His funeral was held at Temple Emanu-El in Manhattan.

References

Further reading
Staff report (June 28, 1973). Lists of White House 'Enemies' and Memorandums Relating to Those Named. The New York Times
Thomas, Landon Jr. (February 24, 2004). Charles Benenson, Developer And Philanthropist, Dies at 91. The New York Times
Accumulating Histories: African Art from the Charles B. Benenson Collection at the Yale University Art Gallery.  Frederick Lamp, Amanda M. Maples, and Laura M. Smalligan.  New Haven, CT: Yale University Press, 2012.

External links 
Benenson Capital Partners LLC website

Records of the Watergate Special Prosecution Force 1971 to 1977 via National Archives and Records Administration

1913 births
2004 deaths
Jewish American philanthropists
American real estate businesspeople
20th-century American businesspeople
Yale University alumni
20th-century American philanthropists
20th-century American Jews
21st-century American Jews